Buren Robinson Sherman (May 28, 1836November 11, 1904) was the 12th Governor of Iowa, serving from 1882 to 1886.

Biography
Sherman was born in Phelps, New York on May 28, 1836.

He studied law after his family moved to Iowa in 1855 and was admitted to the bar in 1859. Sherman then practiced law in Vinton, Iowa in 1860, but only until 1861, when he signed up with the 13th Iowa Volunteer Infantry Regiment for the Union Army. He retired as a captain in mid-1863 due to injuries suffered at Shiloh.

Sherman was elected county judge of Benton County upon his return, resigning from the post in 1866 to accept a position in the office of the clerk of the district court.
From 1874 to 1881 he was Iowa's state auditor.

Sherman was elected Governor of Iowa in 1882 and was the first occupant of the governor's office in the Iowa State Capitol; however, it was his successor, William Larrabee, who first occupied the office for a full term.

In 1885, he was awarded an LL.D. from the University of Iowa. He was also a freemason who was especially active in Scottish Rite Masonry and helped found the Des Moines Scottish Rite Consistory.

Sherman died November 11, 1904, and is buried in the Evergreen Cemetery in Vinton, Iowa.

References

External links

1836 births
1904 deaths
People from Phelps, New York
People from Vinton, Iowa
Iowa lawyers
Union Army officers
Iowa state court judges
Republican Party governors of Iowa
University of Iowa alumni
State Auditors of Iowa
19th-century American judges
19th-century American politicians
Military personnel from Iowa